Jane Bruce (1847 or 1848 – 30 November 1907) was a Canadian teacher.

Biography 
Born in Nova Scotia's Musquodoboit Valley, Bruce spent some time in the United States, likely teaching in Boston for a period. In her 30s, she returned to Nova Scotia where she attended the normal school in Truro, earning a diploma and, in 1883, a first-class license. That same year, she started teaching at Lockman Street School in Halifax, a segregated school for black girls. The next year, the school was merged with the Maynard Street School, creating a coeducational, but still segregated, school, and Bruce was appointed principal.

In 1884 the city's black residents had, after years of protests and campaigning, gained the right to attend integrated primary schools rather than one of the two segregated schools (the other school was in Africville). As the white principal of a segregated school, Bruce was viewed with suspicion by the black community. She was charged with assaulting a pupil in 1886 (she won the case), and was investigated by the school board after letters she wrote to the board, in which she referred to her students as "darkeys", were made public. The investigation exonerated Bruce, but she resigned her position in 1892.

When she reapplied in 1893, the board, despite its earlier decision, declined to hire her. The school supervisor, in protest, offered her a substitute teaching position at the Albro Street School. She remained there until 1901, then transferred to the Acadian School on Argyle Street, once again a principal.

Bruce remained principal of the Acadian School until her death in 1907.

References

1847 births
1907 deaths
People from the Halifax Regional Municipality